Meridian Junior College (MJC) was a junior college in Singapore, offering two-year pre-university courses leading up to the Singapore-Cambridge GCE Advanced Level examination. Situated in the eastern residential estate of Pasir Ris, it is the sixteenth junior college established in Singapore.

History

Founding years 
Meridian Junior College was established in 2003 after Teo Chee Hean, the then Education Minister, suggested building a new junior college in Pasir Ris. Its first principal was Ms Esther Lai Choon Lian.

In 2005, the college hosted its official opening ceremony on 25 February, graced by Teo, and observed its first ever College Day on the 23rd of July. 

Under Lai's leadership of, the college became a single-pointer JC (based on L1R5 admission) in less than a decade.

Incorporation of Tampines Junior College 
On 20 April 2017, it was announced that Meridian Junior College would merge with Tampines Junior College, and continues to operate at its current site under the new name of Tampines Meridian Junior College, which is the combination of the two schools' names, from 2019. TPJC's current principal, Ms Pamela Yoong, will take over as the new principal of Tampines Meridian Junior College. The merger was in view of the declining cohort sizes since 2014, which was attributed to the fall in Singapore's birth rate.

Principal

School Identity & Culture 
Students from Meridian Junior College are referred to as "Meridians", which reflects a close identity with the college.

Insignia, motto and value 

Meridian Junior College's insignia is a grey lion.

The college's motto is "Courage. Purpose. Character."

House system 
Atlas (Gold, Dragon)
Callisto (Blue, Eagle) 
Miranda (Black, Stallion)
Phobos (Red, Phoenix)
Triton (Green, Triton)

Campus
Meridian Junior College's campus include a gym, rehearsal rooms for performing arts groups (with pianos and dance studios), and a library in a 2-storey block, run by the National Library Board. The college has a fully air-conditioned hall, five lecture theatres equipped with audio-visual equipment, and a sports block and track. 

Since 2008, students have access to the school's Integrated Virtual Learning Environment (IVLE), which allows students to discuss assignments online as well as access to academic databases such as The Economist and Science Resource Center. There is also the MJC Leisure and Learning portal where students can sign up for Organised Student Activities, submit suggestions and gain endorsement for participation in projects. 

Currently Meridian Junior College have installed Lecture Recording system, in 2016, allowing students to view lectures during breaks and after school.

Academic information
Meridian Junior College offers Arts and Science courses that leads up to the Singapore-Cambridge GCE Advanced Level examinations. Students at Meridian Junior College are allowed to take up to four subjects at Higher 2 (H2) level. Students with aptitude and deeper interests in subjects can apply to take up to two subjects at Higher 3 (H3) level.

Academic subjects 
The list of subjects offered by Meridian Junior College is featured below.

Co-curricular activities (CCAs)
Meridian Junior College offers a wide variety of CCAs which comprises 14 sports teams, 12 clubs & societies and 6 performing arts groups. Meridian Junior College has a niche in football, with nine National School Games 'A' Division Football Championship titles attained in fifteen years.

A full listing of Co-curricular Activities offered by Meridian Junior College is featured below.

External links

Official website

See also
 Education in Singapore

References

Junior colleges in Singapore
Educational institutions established in 2003
Pasir Ris
2003 establishments in Singapore
2019 disestablishments in Singapore
Educational institutions disestablished in 2019